This is a list of diplomatic missions of Finland. Finland's foreign affairs ministry was established shortly after its independence in 1917. To encourage its international recognition and promote its frontier, trade and maritime interests, Finland had commissioned twelve missions abroad by the end of 1918. By the time of the Second World War broke out there were 20 Finnish embassies (of which four were outside Europe) and six consulates. Today Finland has a streamlined diplomatic network that uses consulates sparingly. In countries without Finnish representation, Finnish citizens can seek assistance from public officials in the foreign services of any of the other Nordic countries, in accordance with the Helsinki Treaty.

Current missions

Africa

Americas

Asia

Europe

Oceania

Multilateral organizations

Gallery

Closed missions

Africa

Americas

Asia

Europe

Oceania

Future missions to open
Below is a list of countries where the government of Finland has stated its intentions to open a diplomatic mission:

 Yerevan (Embassy)

See also
Foreign relations of Finland
List of diplomatic missions of the Nordic countries
Visa policy of the Schengen Area

Notes

References

External links
Ministry of Foreign Affairs of Finland

 
Finland
Diplomatic missions